Angela Haynes (born September 27, 1984) is a former professional tennis player from the United States. Her top WTA singles ranking is world No. 95 which she attained in August 2005.

Her brother Dontia Haynes, a former San Diego State University tennis player, ranked among the top 100 ranked collegiate tennis players in the United States, died 23 September 2005.

Tennis career
In 2004, as a wild card entry, she reached the third round at 2004 US Open, where Francesca Schiavone beat her in two sets. In 2005 first doubles final, partnering Bethanie Mattek-Sands at the JPMorgan Chase Open, they lost against Elena Dementieva and Flavia Pennetta 2–6, 4–6. In 2008 in Memphis, Haynes and Mashona Washington were beaten by Lindsay Davenport and Lisa Raymond, 6–3, 6–1.

Due to some injuries Angela Haynes retired from professional tennis in 2014.

Clothing
Angela's clothing is provided by Adidas. Her racquets are provided by Babolat. Angela's current racquet is believed to be the Babolat Pure Storm. Angela likes to wear bandanas while playing.

Appearances
Angela appears in the 2006 video game Top Spin 2 which is available on the Xbox 360, Game Boy Advance and Nintendo DS.

WTA career finals

Doubles (0–2)

ITF Circuit finals

Singles: 8 (2–6)

Doubles: 20 (8–12)

References

External links
 
 

1984 births
Living people
African-American female tennis players
American female tennis players
Delaware Smash
People from Bellflower, California
Tennis people from California
21st-century African-American sportspeople
21st-century African-American women
20th-century African-American people
20th-century African-American women